The Schredeneck-See oil field was a significant oil field in the German sector of the Baltic Sea. It was the first oil field in the Baltic, and was Germany’s first offshore oil field. lt produced oil from 1984 until 2000.

The field 
The Schredeneck-See field is located in Kiel Bay in the Baltic Sea about 5 km east from the coast. The reservoir is a Jurassic sandstone at a depth of about 1,511 metres, with a thickness of 8.2 m. The properties of the reservoir and its fluids are: 

The field was discovered in July 1978 and had recoverable reserves of 2.5 million tonnes or 18.5 million barrels of oil.

Development 
The field was developed by a 50/50% joint venture with Deutsche Texaco AG and Wintershall AG. The project was estimated to cost in excess of DM 300 million (1983 prices). It was developed using two offshore installations and a shore base. There were plans to construct one or two further offshore installations to further develop the field but these were not constructed. The operator opted to build two, single column, concrete gravity base structures to withstand seasonal ice floes in the Baltic. 

The platforms were designed by C. G. Doris and IMS of Hamburg. The gravity base comprises a central shaft 13 m in diameter surrounded by 8 shafts of the same diameter and a height of 12.85 m to protect the central column and for water ballasting. The base area was 38 by 38 m.The height of the column was 36.95 m and supported the lower deck of the topsides at this level. 

Crude oil was processed through a closed system with processing onshore at Waabs, oil was then sent to the Texaco refinery at Heide. Associated gas produced at Waabs was used for space heating at the terminal and at the nearby Damp 2000 recreation centre. Because of the low gas-oil-ratio there was no flaring of gas on the platforms. Electrical submersible pumps were installed within the wells at a depth of about 1,200 m. The installations were operated remotely from the shore station. When initially commissioned the field produced 1,100 tonnes/d or 8,000 barrels/day of crude oil.

Decommissioning 
The RWE-DEA corporation closed the installations in 2000. The topsides were removed and the gravity bases refloated and removed for disposal in 2002.

See also 

 Mittelplate

References 

Oil fields of Germany